Altınhüseyin is a village in the Pülümür District, Tunceli Province, Turkey. The village is populated by Kurds of the Çarekan tribe and had a population of 17 in 2021.

The hamlets of Arılı, Ayranlı, Bahçe, Başeğmez, Buğdaylı, Dalaltı, Dedecik, Düzçatı, Kavacık and Söğütlü are attached to the village.

References 

Kurdish settlements in Tunceli Province
Villages in Pülümür District